The Early Tapes (July/Aug 1980), also known as Strategy, is the second album released, but first to be recorded, by the British group Level 42. Originally recorded for Elite Records, the band subsequently signed to Polydor, who bought the masters from Elite and issued it in March 1982. It features Level 42's first two singles - "Love Meeting Love" (UK #61) and "Wings of Love".

Tracks
   "Sandstorm"  (Badarou, King) – 4:41
   "Love Meeting Love" (Gould, King) – 6:24 
   "Theme to Margaret" (King) – 3:59
   "Autumn (Paradise Is Free)" (King) – 4:45 
   "Wings of Love" (Badarou, Gould, Gould, King, Lindup) – 6:58
   "Woman" (Lindup) – 4:38
   "Mr. Pink" (Badarou, King) – 5:08
   "88" (King) – 5:11

Personnel
Level 42
Mark King – bass guitar, percussion, vocals on "Love Meeting Love" & "Autumn (Paradise is Free)", chant vocals on "88"
Mike Lindup – keyboards, percussion, vocals on "Wings of Love", chant vocals on "88"
Boon Gould – guitars, alto saxophone
Phil Gould – drums, percussion
with:
Wally Badarou – Prophet 5 and inspiration
Leroy Williams – percussion (Courtesy EMI)
Dave Chambers – tenor and soprano  saxophones

Charts

Release history

References

External links
 Level 42 Official Website

1982 albums
Level 42 albums
Albums produced by Mike Vernon (record producer)
Polydor Records albums